Cilarapu Damodar Raja Narasimha (born 5 December 1958) is an Indian politician who served as the Deputy Chief Minister of Andhra Pradesh between 2011 and 2014. He represented Andole constituency as a Member of the Legislative Assembly (MLA) from the Indian National Congress, and held ministerial portfolios of Higher education and Agriculture (in charge).

Early life
Cilarapu Damodar Raja Narasimha was born on 5 December 1958 in a Dalit family in Medak district to Congress politician Raja Narsimha and Janabai. His father served as an MLA representing Andole thrice. 

Narasimha graduated from the tertiary institution as an engineer. Following the death of his father, Narasimha gave up his dream of becoming a bureaucrat and entered politics.

Political career
Narasimha began his political career in 1989 when he was elected as an MLA from Andole (SC) constituency as a member of Indian National Congress. He lost subsequent elections until winning again in 2004 and later in 2009.

In 2004, Narasimha joined YS Rajasekhar Reddy's cabinet as a Minister for Primary Education. In 2009, he was appointed Minister for Marketing and Warehousing. 

Narasimha became Deputy Chief Minister of Andhra Pradesh on 10 June 2011 and served until April 2014.

Positions held

 Minister for Marketing and Warehousing 2009 - 2010
 Minister for Primary Education  2007 - 2009
 Chairman — SC Finance Corporation

Personal life
Narasimha is married to Padmini. They have a daughter.

References

Indian National Congress politicians from Telangana
Living people
1958 births
Politicians from Secunderabad
Andhra Pradesh MLAs 1989–1994
Andhra Pradesh MLAs 2004–2009
Andhra Pradesh MLAs 2009–2014
Deputy Chief Ministers of Andhra Pradesh